Nicholas Antony "Nicky" Scaife (born 14 May 1975) is an English former professional footballer who played as a midfielder in the Football League for York City, and in non-League football for Guisborough Town, Whitby Town, Pickering Town and Gateshead.

References

1975 births
Living people
Footballers from Middlesbrough
English footballers
Association football midfielders
Guisborough Town F.C. players
Whitby Town F.C. players
York City F.C. players
Pickering Town F.C. players
Gateshead F.C. players
English Football League players